Faragheh Rural District is in the Central District of Abarkuh County, Yazd province, Iran. At the National Census of 2006, its population was 3,102 in 884 households. There were 3,439 inhabitants in 1,072 households at the following census of 2011. At the most recent census of 2016, the population of the rural district was 3,456 in 1,124 households. The largest of its 103 villages was Faragheh, with 1,040 people.

References 

Abarkuh County

Rural Districts of Yazd Province

Populated places in Yazd Province

Populated places in Abarkuh County